(German: 'The Steel Helmet, League of Front-Line Soldiers'), commonly known as  ('The Steel Helmet'), was a German First World War veteran's organisation existing from 1918 to 1935. It was part of the "Black Reichswehr" and in the late days of the Weimar Republic operated as the paramilitary wing of the monarchist German National People's Party (DNVP), placed at party gatherings in the position of armed security guards.

History

Weimar Republic (1918–1933)

Der Stahlhelm was formed on 25 December 1918 in Magdeburg, Germany, by the factory owner and first World War-disabled reserve officer Franz Seldte. After the 11 November armistice, the Army had been split up and the newly established German Reichswehr according to the Treaty of Versailles was to be confined to no more than 100,000 men. Similar to the numerous Freikorps, which upon the Revolution of 1918–1919 were temporarily backed by the Council of the People's Deputies under Chancellor Friedrich Ebert (Ebert–Groener pact), Der Stahlhelm ex-servicemen's organization was meant to form a paramilitary organization.

The league was a rallying point for revanchist and nationalistic forces from the beginning. Within the organization a worldview oriented toward the prior Imperial regime and the Hohenzollern monarchy predominated, many of its members promoting the Dolchstosslegende ("Stab-in-the-back legend") and the "November Criminals" bias against the Weimar Coalition government. Its journal, Der Stahlhelm, was edited by Count Hans-Jürgen von Blumenthal, later hanged for his part in the 20 July plot. Financing was provided by the Deutscher Herrenklub, an association of German industrialists and business magnates with elements of the East Elbian landed gentry (Junker). Jewish veterans were denied admission and formed a separate Reichsbund jüdischer Frontsoldaten.

After the failed Kapp Putsch of 1920, the organization gained further support from dissolved Freikorps units. In 1923 the former DNVP politician Theodor Duesterberg joined Der Stahlhelm and quickly rose to Seldte's deputy and long–time rival. In 1923, Stahlhelm units were actively involved in the formally passive resistance struggle of paramilitary formations against the French occupation of the Ruhr area. These units were responsible for numerous acts of sabotage on French trains and military posts. One of the volunteers operating in the Ruhr area was Paul Osthold, who headed the German Institute for Technical Work Training (DINTA) in the 1930s and became one of the leading representatives of German employers' associations in the Federal Republic of Germany. From 1924 on, in several subsidiary organizations, veterans with front line experience as well as new recruits would provide a standing armed force in support of the Reichswehr beyond the 100,000 men allowed. With 500,000 members in 1930, the league was the largest paramilitary organization of Weimar Republic. In the 1920s Der Stahlhelm received political support from Fascist Italy's Duce Benito Mussolini.

Although Der Stahlhelm was officially a non-party entity and above party politics, after 1929 it took on an anti-republican and anti-democratic character. Its goals were a German dictatorship, the preparation of a revanchist program, and the direction of local anti-parliamentarian action. For political reasons its members distinguished themselves from the Nazi Party (NSDAP) as "German Fascists". Among their further demands were the establishment of a Greater Germanic People's Reich, struggle against Social Democracy, the "mercantilism of the Jews" and the general liberal democratic worldview, and attempted without success to place candidates favorable to the politics of a renewed expansion to the East.

In 1929 Der Stahlhelm supported the "Peoples' Initiative" of DNVP leader Alfred Hugenberg and the Nazis to initiate a German referendum against the Young Plan on World War I reparations in order to overthrow the government of Chancellor Hermann Müller. In 1931 they proposed another referendum for the dissolution of the Prussian Landtag. After both these referendums failed to reach the 50% necessary to be declared valid, the organization in October 1931 joined another attempt of DNVP, NSDAP and Pan-German League to form the Harzburg Front, a united right-wing campaign against the Weimar Republic and Chancellor Heinrich Brüning. However, the front soon broke up and in the first round of the 1932 German presidential election, Theodor Duesterberg ran as Der Stahlhelm candidate against incumbent Paul von Hindenburg and Adolf Hitler. Facing a massive Nazi campaign reproaching him with a non-pure "Aryan" ancestry he only gained 6.8% of the votes cast.

Nazi Germany (1933–1935)

After the Nazi seizure of power on 30 January 1933, the new authorities urged for a merger into the party's Sturmabteilung (SA) paramilitary organization. Seldte joined the Hitler Cabinet as Reich Minister for Labour, prevailing against Duesterberg. Der Stahlhelm still tried to keep its distance from the Nazis, and in the run-up to the German federal election of 5 March 1933 formed the united conservative "Black-White-Red Struggle Front" (Kampffront Schwarz-Weiß-Rot) with the DNVP and the Agricultural League, reaching 8% of the votes.

On 27 March 1933, an SA raid with the intention of disarmament of Stahlhelm members in Braunschweig, who under the command of Werner Schrader had forged an alliance with scattered Republican Reichsbanner forces. The violent incident initiated by Nazi Minister Dietrich Klagges and later called Der Stahlhelm Putsch was characteristic of the pressure applied by the Nazis on Der Stahlhelm in this period, mistrusting the organization due to its fundamentally monarchist character. In April Seldte applied for membership in the NSDAP and also joined the SA, from August 1933 in the rank of an Obergruppenführer.

On 27 April 1933, Seldte had officially declared Der Stahlhelm subordinate to Hitler's command. The attempts by the Nazis to integrate Der Stahlhelm succeeded in 1934 in the course of the "voluntary" Gleichschaltung process: the organization was renamed Nationalsozialistischer Deutscher frontkämpfer-Bund (Stahlhelm) (NSDFBSt) while large parts were merged into the SA as Wehrstahlhelm, Reserve I and Reserve II contingents.

The remaining NSDFBSt local groups were finally dissolved by decree of Adolf Hitler on 7 November 1935. Seldte's rival Duesterberg was interned at Dachau concentration camp upon the Night of the Long Knives at the beginning of July 1934, but released soon after.

Ranks and insignia

See also
 Weimar paramilitary groups

References

Further reading

External links

 Der Stahlhelm, Bund der Frontsoldaten  at the German Historical Museum, Berlin
 Der Stahlhelm, Bund der Frontsoldaten at Flags of the World
 
 

 
1918 establishments in Germany
1935 disestablishments in Germany
Aftermath of World War I in Germany
Clubs and societies in Germany
Defunct paramilitary organizations
German National People's Party
German veterans' organisations
Organisations based in Berlin
Organizations established in 1918
Organizations disestablished in 1935
Organizations of the German Revolution of 1918–1919
Political advocacy groups in Germany